176 riders across 22 eight-member teams took part in the 2022 Tour de France. Twenty-seven nationalities took part, with the largest percentage being French (11% of the peloton). 135 riders finished the event.

Teams

UCI WorldTeams

 
 
 
 
 
 
 
 
 
 
 
 
 
 
 
 
 
 

UCI ProTeams

Cyclists

By starting number

By team

By nationality

Notes

References

2022 Tour de France
2022